Dollman vs. Demonic Toys (on screen title being Dollman vs. the Demonic Toys) is a 1993 American direct-to-video horror film. It is a continuation of three films released by Full Moon Features: Dollman, Demonic Toys and Bad Channels.

Much of the movie consists of flashbacks from the three previous movies, aimed to enhance the story and promote the earlier movies. This film was followed by Puppet Master vs. Demonic Toys in 2004 with alternate designs for the toys, which initially aired on Syfy. In 2010, a direct sequel to the first film titled Demonic Toys: Personal Demons was released, which ignores the events in Dollman vs. Demonic Toys. Although the UK DVD inlay refers to the events.

Plot
The film begins with Brick Bardo (Tim Thomerson from Dollman) hitchhiking to get to the town of Pahoota, where he tries to find a girl named Nurse Ginger (Melissa Behr, playing her character from Bad Channels), to prove to her that she is not alone. Meanwhile, the film cuts to Judith Grey (Tracy Scoggins from Demonic Toys), who has a nightmare about the events that happened in the previous film a year before. Ever since the events that took place a year before, Judith has been watching the Toyland Warehouse, believing that the toys are still alive. Meanwhile, a drunken bum enters the warehouse to shelter from the rain, and starts to mess around with a clown tricycle until he gets knocked in the head with a box of toys, causing him to hit his head on the ground, killing him. However, his blood continues to flow over to the place where the demon was buried and brings back Baby Oopsy Daisy, Jack Attack, and Mr. Static. Grizzly Teddy is replaced by a new toy named Zombietoid – a blonde GI Joe action figure with a machete as a weapon.

Judith, who is now inside the building, sees the toys in full view, but is then arrested for breaking into a secluded building while serving out a suspension. After the police leave, the toys force the new security guard, Ray Vernon to help them with their needs. Ginger, who spends her time on a kitchen counter all alone, is being harassed by a sleazy reporter for an interview and so she reluctantly agrees so he'll leave her in peace. After he leaves, a big spider appears and as Ginger screams, Brick suddenly shows up and shoots it dead. Then a surprised Ginger asks Brick how he's so tiny like her, which results in both characters recapping their stories. 

Meanwhile, Judith, who now knows about Nurse Ginger and Brick Bardo's history, bribes the news reporter to tell her where they are, and tells her they are in Pahoota. Judith, after having a deal with Bardo and Ginger to help her kill the toys, go to the warehouse and Ginger initially doesn't believe the tale about the toys being really alive. Meanwhile, the toys kill a blonde hooker and makes her bleed on the place, where the demon was buried. As Judith and friends enter the building, a fight begins, ending with Judith weakenly shooting Ray in the head, killing him before getting shot herself by Mr. Static, which then Brick blasts him to pieces. Brick, who has made a promise to Judith (cop to cop thing), continues to finish that promise, but Zombietoid knocks his gun out of his hand and it falls under a pile of crates, has his hands and feet tied to two toy trucks, and Ginger tied on to a clock when they are separated inside the ventilation shafts.

Baby Oopsy Daisy explains to Brick that once midnight strikes, the Demon's soul is going to go inside Baby Oopsy Daisy so he can rape Nurse Ginger, make the baby, eat its soul from the shell, and become a human. As Baby Oopsie Daisy is about to kill Brick, Ginger breaks free, cuts him loose, and gets carried away by Zombietoid, who continues to go after Brick. Brick and Zombietoid begin fighting, until Zombietoid's machete gets caught in an electric socket, killing him. After using a hockey stick to retrieve his gun, Brick continues on and finds Jack Attack, whom he kills by blasting Jack Attack's head to bloody smithereens, leaving only his torso intact.

Brick finally gets to the dollhouse shortly after the stroke of midnight and sees Baby Oopsy Daisy undressing Ginger in preparation for sex. Baby Oopsy Daisy demands Brick to drop his firearm or he will quickly kill Ginger with cervical dislocation. Brick complies and tosses his gun out of his reach. Baby Oopsy Daisy tries to penetrate Ginger, but is once again interrupted, this time due to a hard kick to his groin by Ginger after he unwittingly mentions that he is now possessed by The Master. The low blow causes her to be released from Baby Oopsy Daisy's grasp, giving Brick the opportunity to quickly summon his gun where he then fatally shoots the bewildered Baby Oopsy Daisy several times. Brick continues to call the police and tells them that Judith Grey died in the line of duty and leaves, along with Nurse Ginger, in a cab that is on its way back to Pahoota.

Cast
 Tim Thomerson as Brick Bardo
 Tracy Scoggins as Judith Grey
 Melissa Behr as Nurse Ginger
 Phillip Brock as Collins
 Phil Fondacaro as Ray Vernon
 R.C. Bates as Bum
 Willie C. Carpenter as Police Officer
 Peter Chen as Cab Driver

Additional Voices
 Frank Welker as Baby Oopsie Daisy
 'Evil' Ted Smith as Zombietoid
 Tim Dornberg as Jack Attack
 Brigitte Lynn as Mr. Static

Production
Dollman vs. Demonic Toys utilizes footage from the films Bad Channels and Dollman for flashback scenes throughout the movie.

Release
Dollman vs. Demonic Toys was released direct-to-video on October 13, 1993. It was later given a DVD release in the 2005 box set "The Dollman / Demonic Toys Box Set" along with its two predecessors Demonic Toys and Dollman.

On November 9, 2010, Echo Bridge Home Entertainment released a triple feature set containing this film, Dollman and Demonic Toys.

Reception 
Critical reception has been negative. Critic Dennis Fischer panned the film in his 2011 book covering science fiction directors as "one of Band's worst missteps". A reviewer for Billboard was more favorable, writing that "Good-humored viewers will enjoy this silly, but fast-moving quickie."

See also
List of films featuring miniature people

References

External links

1993 direct-to-video films
1993 horror films
1993 films
1990s action films
1990s science fiction films
American science fiction action films
American science fiction horror films
American action horror films
1990s English-language films
Horror crossover films
Films about sentient toys
American direct-to-video films
Demonic Toys films
Full Moon Features films
Puppet films
American supernatural horror films
American sequel films
Films directed by Charles Band
Films with screenplays by David S. Goyer
Films scored by Richard Band
Dollman films
Paramount Pictures direct-to-video films
Sentient toys in fiction
1990s American films